These are the official results of the Women's 100 metres event at the 1993 IAAF World Championships in Stuttgart, Germany. There were a total number of 55 participating athletes, with seven qualifying heats, and the final was held on Monday 16 August.

Final

Semifinals
Held on Monday 1993-08-16

Quarterfinals
Held on Sunday 1993-08-15

Qualifying heats
Held on Sunday 1993-08-15

See also
 1992 Women's Olympic 100 metres

References
 Results
 Results - World Athletics

 
100 metres at the World Athletics Championships
1993 in women's athletics